My Life in Film is a British television situation-comedy series written by Mark Chappell and originally aired on BBC Three, and then on BBC Two.

It uses iconography, situations and dialogue from films. Some of the show's humour is derived from the deliberate adaptation of these films to everyday settings, leading to preposterous results.

The series ran for one season of six episodes in 2004.

The characters
The series revolves around three characters: Art (played by Kris Marshall), Jones (Andrew Scott), and Beth (Alice Lowe).

Arthur ("Art")
Art is the central character. He is a no-hoper dreaming of being a film director. Art constantly describes himself as "an independent low-budget filmmaker", despite having never made a film. He is continually coming up with ideas for storylines, and has written many scripts of apparently dubious quality.

Jones
Jones is Art's long-suffering best friend. They share a London flat in a small, old apartment complex. Jones is frequently the sufferer of mishaps brought about by Art's inability to deal with the real world, yet appears to need to look after him despite Art's many faults.

Beth
Beth is Jones's girlfriend. She and Art have an antagonistic attitude towards each other, largely because Beth can see how Art's lack of abilities is impinging on Jones's life. In response Art claims to be allergic to Beth. Despite this, as the series progresses there is a slow thawing in the relationship between Beth and Art, and in the final episode she decides to move in with Jones, even though this would mean sharing a flat with Art.

The episodes
None of the episodes are named, but each is based on the plot and style of a particular film. The episodes were re-ordered for their BBC Three broadcast; on the subsequent BBC Two repeat run, the original order was restored.

External links
 
 

BBC television comedy